Robert Bingham Downs (May 25, 1903 – February 24, 1991) was an American writer and librarian. Downs was an advocate for intellectual freedom. Downs spent the majority of his career working against, and voicing opposition to, literary censorship.  Downs authored many books and publications regarding the topics of censorship, and on the topics of responsible and efficient leadership in the library context.

Life 
Robert Downs was born May 25, 1903, in the southern small town of Lenoir, North Carolina, United States. He was the seventh child of eight of Mr. John McLeod, an educator and local part-time politico, and Clarissa Catherine Hartley Downs, who suffered from periodic ambulatory incapacity. Downs married classmate Elizabeth Crooks in 1929. Elizabeth and Robert had two daughters Clara (Mrs. William Keller) and Roberta (Mrs. Terence Andre). In 1982, Elizabeth Downs died.  Subsequently, Robert Downs was remarried to Jane Wilson in 1983. Downs has three grandchildren and five great-grandchildren. He was a supporter of the Democratic Party. Robert B. Downs died at the age of 87 of pneumonia in 1991 at his home in the city of Urbana, Illinois.

Educational background 

Downs attended the one-room schoolhouse called Shady Grove until his high school years when his family relocated to Asheville, North Carolina.  After the completion of his high school curricula, Downs went on to study at the University of North Carolina (A.B. 1926), the School of Library Science at Columbia University (B.S. 1927, M.S. 1929).  During his Masters coursework, Downs was employed at the New York Library and as a librarian for two years (1929 to 1931) at Colby College in Maine.  Downs earned a Doctor of Letters from Colby College (1944) and from University of Illinois (1973).  In addition, Downs earned a LL.D. from North Carolina University in 1949, and L.H.D.s from Ohio State University (1963) and Southern Illinois University (1970).

Employment
The following "Employment" section uses data procured from the source: Contemporary Authors Online, Gale, 2008. 

 1922–1926: Assistant Librarian, University of North Carolina
 1927–1929: Librarian, Colby College
 1929–1931: Assistant Librarian, New York Public Library
 1931–1932: Assistant Librarian, University of North Carolina
 1932–1934: Librarian and Associate Professor of Library Science, University of North Carolina
 1934–1938: Librarian and Professor, University of North Carolina
 1938–1943: Director of Library and Library Sch. – Director of Libraries, New York University
 1943–1958: Professor of Library Science, University of Illinois
 1958–1971: Dean Library Administration, University of Illinois
 1971:            Dean Emeritus, University of Illinois
 1973:            Visiting Professor at University of Toronto
 1975:            University of North Carolina
 In addition, Downs served as an adviser to many overseas libraries.

Professional/academic memberships 
The following "Professional/academic" section uses data procured from the source: Contemporary Authors Online, Gale, 2008. 

 1951–1952: Vice President, American Library Association
 1952–1953: President, American Library Association
 1955–1956: President, Illinois Library Association

In addition, Downs was a member of:

 Southeastern Library Association
 American Association of University Professors
 Authors League America
 Society of Midland Authors
 Committee on Books Abroad
 United States Information Agency
 Phi Beta Kappa
 Beta Phi Mu
 Phi Kappa Phi

Endeavors 

While Downs looked to heroes Abraham Lincoln and Thomas Jefferson for guidance when challenges were encumbered, it was the influences of his distant cousin, Mr. Louis Round Wilson, that formed Downs’ librarian leadership foundation.  During his tenure as President of the American Library Association, Downs became a strong force against what he viewed as suppressive forces of literature.  Downs produced many publications during his life and is best known for his book titled Books That Changed the World.  This publication enjoyed a great deal of success and was subsequently translated into many languages.,  Downs was also known for his accession talents and developed a proclivity for rare books regarding the topic of American folklore.  Aided by Mr. Gordon N. Ray, Downs' talents would eventually facilitate realization of the private papers of noted authors H.G. Wells and Carl Sandburg. These collections are currently part of The Rare Book & Manuscript Library at the University of Illinois at Urbana-Champaign.

Works 
The following "Works" section is a direct reflection of data from the source: Contemporary Authors Online, Gale, 2008.

 (With Louis R. Wilson) Report of a Survey of the Libraries of Cornell University, Cornell University Press, 1948.
 Books That Changed the World, New American Library, 1956, 2nd edition, American Library Association, 1978.
 (With others) Family Saga and Other Phases of American Folklore, University of Illinois Press, 1958.
 Molders of the Modern Mind: 111 Books That Shaped Western Civilization, Barnes & Noble, 1961.
 Strengthening and Improving Library Resources for Southern Higher Education, Southern Regional Education Board, 1962.
 The Kabul University Library, University of Wyoming Education Program, 1963.
 (Editor) The Bear Went over the Mountain, Macmillan, 1964.
 Famous Books, Ancient and Medieval, Barnes & Noble, 1964.
 Resources of North Carolina Libraries, Governor's Commission on Library Resources, 1965.
 How to Do Library Research, University of Illinois Press, 1966, 2nd edition, 1975.
 Resources of Missouri Libraries, Missouri State Library, 1966.
 (With Frances B. Jenkins) Bibliography: Current State and Future Trends, University of Illinois Press, 1967.
 Resources of Canadian Academic and Research Libraries, Association of Universities of Canada, 1967.
 University Library Statistics, Association of Research Libraries, 1968.
 Books That Changed America, Macmillan, 1970.
 Famous American Books, McGraw, 1971.
 Books and History, University of Illinois Library School, 1974.
 Horace Mann, Twayne, 1974.
 Heinrich Pestalozzi, Twayne, 1975.
 Famous Books, Littlefield, 1975.
 Books That Changed the South, University of North Carolina Press, 1977.
 Henry Barnard, Twayne, 1977.
 Friedrich Froebel, Twayne, 1978.
 Australian and New Zealand Library Resources, Mansell, 1979.
 British and Irish Resources, Mansell, 1981.
 Landmarks in Science, Libraries Unlimited, 1982.
 (With others) Memorable Americans, Libraries Unlimited, 1983.
 Perspectives on the Past, an Autobiography, Scarecrow, 1984.
 (With John T. Flanagan and Harold W. Scott) More Memorable Americans, Libraries Unlimited, 1985.
 Books in My Life, Library of Congress (Washington, DC), 1985.
 (Compiler) Images of America: Travelers from Abroad in the New World, University of Illinois Press, 1987.
 Scientific Enigmas, Libraries Unlimited, 1987.
 A Dictionary of Eminent Librarians, High Plains Publishing (Worland, WY), 1990.
 (With Jane B. Downs) Journalists of the United States: Biographical Sketches of Print and Broadcast News Shapers from the Late seventeenth Century to the Present, McFarland (Jefferson, NC), 1991.

Honors
Lippincott Award for distinguished service to the profession of librarianship. 1964. 
Robert B. Downs Intellectual Freedom Award established in 1969 to celebrate Downs' 25th year as director of the School of Information Sciences at the University of Illinois. 
 Honorary Member, American Library Association. 1976.

References

External links
 

 

1903 births
1991 deaths
Presidents of the American Library Association
University of North Carolina at Chapel Hill alumni
Columbia University School of Library Service alumni
Ohio State University alumni
University of Illinois Urbana-Champaign alumni
Southern Illinois University alumni
Colby College alumni
Colby College faculty
20th-century American writers
20th-century American male writers
People from Lenoir, North Carolina